Darestan (also Romanized as Dārestān; also known as Darestan Koohpayeh) is a village in Ravar Rural District, in the Central District of Ravar County, Kerman Province, Iran. At the 2006 census, its population was 83, in 33 families.

References 

Populated places in Ravar County